Events from the year 1171 in Ireland.

Events
May – following the death of Diarmait Mac Murchada, King of Leinster, the lordship of Leinster is disputed between his son, Domhnall Caomhánach, and the Cambro-Norman Richard de Clare (Strongbow).
Henry II of England arrives in Ireland; Irish bishops and most Irish kings submit to his rule.
Ascall mac Ragnaill, last Norse–Gaelic King of Dublin, is captured while trying to retake Dublin from de Clare, perhaps in company with Sweyn Asleifsson, and beheaded; before the end of the year, de Clare relinquishes possession  of the city to his own liege lord, Henry.

Deaths
1 May – Diarmait Mac Murchada, King of Leinster (born 1110).
Ascall mac Ragnaill, King of Dublin.

References